A list of Kappa Delta Phi chapters.

References
https://web.archive.org/web/20150722041330/http://kappadeltaphi.org/about#tab-id-3

External links
Official homepage

chapters
Lists of chapters of United States student societies by society